The Billboard U.S. Afrobeats Songs is a chart that ranks the best-performing Afrobeats singles of the United States. Its data is assembled by the charts production manager Michael Cusson, and published on Billboard magazine. At the end of the year, Billboard will publish an annual list of the 100 most successful songs throughout that year on the Afrobeats chart based on the information. For 2022, the list was published on December 1, and calculated with data from April 2, 2022, to November 19, 2022.

Billboard named Tems the US top Afrobeats Artist of 2022, making her the first African artist to achieve this honor. Tems placed ten songs on the list, with one featured song being the highest ranked of them by Wizkid titled "Essence", placed at number one. Essence features guest vocals from Justin Bieber and Tems. The song became the first Nigerian song in history to chart on the Hot 100 chart.

Year-end list

References

2022 record charts
Billboard charts
2022 in American music